The 2013 China League One is the tenth season of the China League One, the second tier of the Chinese football league pyramid, since its establishment.

Teams

Team Changes

To League One 

Teams relegated from 2012 Chinese Super League
 Henan Jianye

Teams promoted from 2012 China League Two
 Guizhou Zhicheng 
 Hubei China-Kyle

From League One 
Teams promoted to 2013 Chinese Super League
 Shanghai East Asia
 Wuhan Zall

Teams relegated to 2013 China League Two
 Hohhot Dongjin

Name changes 
Fujian Smart Hero moved to the city of Shijiazhuang and changed their name to Shijiazhuang Yongchang Junhao in December 2012.

Harbin Songbei Yiteng changed their name to Harbin Yiteng.

Clubs

Stadiums and Locations

Managerial changes

Note1:Executive manager was Wei Xin.

Foreign players
Restricting the number of foreign players strictly to three per CL1 team.
A team could use three foreign players on the field each game. Players came from Hong Kong, Macau and Chinese Taipei were deemed as native players in CL1.

 Foreign players who left their clubs after first half of the season.

Hong Kong/Macau/Taiwan players (doesn't count on the foreign player slot)

League table

Results

Positions by round

Top scorers

Awards
The awards of 2013 China League One were announced on 19 December 2013.
 Most valuable player:  Xu Yang (Henan Jianye)
 Top scorer:  Babacar Gueye (Shenzhen Ruby)
 Best goalkeeper:  Zhou Yajun (Henan Jianye)
 Best coach:  Tang Yaodong (Henan Jianye)

League Attendance

†

References

External links 
  
China League One at sina.com 
China League One at sohu.com 

China League One seasons
2
China
China